Falls Church City Public Schools (FCCPS) is a public school district that serves the City of Falls Church, Virginia. It is a PreK-12 IB World School division, meaning all schools in the district are IB-certified.

In 2022, the FCCPS IB Primary Years Programme, IB Middle Years Programme, and IB Diploma Programmes completed their five-year evaluation.  Due to the pandemic, IB evaluators did their work remotely visiting classrooms and meeting with various stakeholders, including parents, students, teachers, and leadership teams, to get a comprehensive view of our program.  During the concluding meeting with school leadership, the evaluation team highlighted many aspects of our program, including our commitment to a high-quality learning environment and the strong development of internationally-minded students. They found "No Matters to be Addressed" with the MYP & DP programmes, and "All Requirements in Place" with the PYP programme.

The school division's five schools served 2,628 students in the 2019-20 school year. The on-time graduation rate is 99.5 percent.  The 2019 SAT score average was 1261.

In 2022, Challenge_Index ranked Meridian High School (Virginia) in the Top 1% of 22,000 high schools in the country, and 1 of only 3 Virginia schools in the Top 1%. Meridian is ranked #2 in Virginia, and #171 in the nation.  The Challenge_Index, created by former Washington Post Education columnist, Jay Mathews, is the oldest high school ranking system in the country, beginning in 1998 in both Newsweek and the Washington Post.

In 2021, 2022, and 2023 Niche listed Falls Church City Public Schools as the Best School District in Virginia and 2nd Best School District in the Washington D.C. Metro.

In 2021, Newsweek listed Falls Church City Public Schools as the Best School District in Virginia for the second year in a row. 

In 2020 and 2021, 24WallSt.com listed Falls Church City Public Schools as the Best School District in Virginia in its special report: The Best School District in Every State.

In 2020, U.S. News & World Report ranked FCCPS' Meridian High School (Virginia) #16 in Virginia in its 2019 Best High Schools in America Ranking.

In 2019, U.S. News & World Report ranked Falls Church, VA the 3rd Healthiest Community in America and received the only perfect 100 scores in the Education subcategory of the 500 communities included.

History
FCCPS officially became an independent school system on June 27, 1949, when the Virginia Board of Education authorized its separation from the Fairfax County school system.  Falls Church had obtained the enabling legislation to form an independent city in the year before, in 1948.

Schools
Jessie Thackrey Preschool (pre-K)
Mount Daniel Elementary (K-2)
Oak Street Elementary School (Grades 3-5)
Mary Ellen Henderson Middle School (Grades 6-8)
Meridian High School (Virginia) (Grades 9-12) (formerly George Mason)

See also
 List of school divisions in Virginia

References

External links
 
 Employment Opportunities at FCCPS
 FCCPS on Twitter
 FCCPS on Facebook

School divisions in Virginia
Education in Falls Church, Virginia
1949 establishments in Virginia
School districts established in 1949